Luch Scientific Production Association or NPO Luch is a manufacturing business in Novosibirsk, Russia. It was founded in 1942. Production: artillery fuses, tape recorders, children's toys, etc.

History
The plant was established in 1942.

During the Great Patriotic War, it produced high-explosive shells (20 and 23 mm) and a large number of delay and instantaneous fuses for artillery and aircraft shells.

In 1956, the plant began production of sound recording and reproduction devices for radiograms, later it began to produce tape recorders.

According to data from 2002, NPO produced radio fuses for anti-aircraft and field artillery shells.

Production
Artillery fuzes, Nota tape recorders, Luch photocatalytic air cleaners, meteorological equipment, children's toys (the board game Hockey etc.).

Finance
In 2013, the plant's revenue amounted to 138.5 million rubles, the net loss was 113.2 million rubles, the overdue debt of the enterprise as of December 31, 2013 amounted to 149.3 million rubles.

References

Bibliography

External links
 НПО Луч. Деловой квартал.

Manufacturing companies based in Novosibirsk
1942 establishments in the Soviet Union
Toy companies of Russia
Audio equipment manufacturers of Russia
Electronics companies of the Soviet Union
Defence companies of the Soviet Union